Silvia Elena Buendía Silva (born 9 October 1967 in Guayaquil) is an Ecuadorian lawyer, TV host, columnist, and feminist activist. She is noted for her campaigning for the legalization of gay marriage in her country.
She writes a column in El Telégrafo, and has contributed to other newspapers and magazines in Ecuador. In the 2010s she has become known as a television presenter, hosting shows such as Así Somos and Ventana Ciudadana on Ecuador TV.7.

References

Ecuadorian women writers
Ecuadorian journalists
Ecuadorian women journalists
Ecuadorian activists
Ecuadorian women activists
Ecuadorian LGBT rights activists
People from Guayaquil
Ecuadorian feminists
1967 births
Living people
Ecuadorian women lawyers
21st-century Ecuadorian women politicians
21st-century Ecuadorian politicians